DOTAM (also known as TCMC) is an organic compound used as a chelator much like its carboxylic acid analog DOTA. A derivative with a reactive linking group of para-isothiocyanatobenzyl attached to the cyclen ring is also of interest as a bifunctional chelator (BFC).

References 

Macrocycles
Acetamides
Octadentate ligands